The 2017 World Rugby Americas Pacific Challenge was the second tournament of the Americas Pacific Challenge, which is a development competition for the Americas and Pacific island nations. The competition was hosted by Uruguay with all games played at the 14,000 capacity stadium Estadio Charrúa in Montevideo.

Format
With six teams in the tournament and a limitation of three matches per team, a "split pool" format was used. The field was split into two pools, with teams in one pool only playing the teams in the other. The competing teams were:    

Pool A

Pool B

Table
Final standings for combined pools:

Fixtures
All times are local UYT (UTC-03)

The matches were announced on 14 September 2017.

Round 1

Round 2

Round 3

See also
 2017 end-of-year rugby union internationals
 Americas Rugby Championship
 World Rugby Pacific Challenge

References

External links
 

Americas Pacific Challenge 2017 official webpage at worldrugby.org 

World Rugby Americas Pacific Challenge
Americas Pacific
2017 in Tongan rugby union
2017 in Samoan rugby union
2017 in Uruguayan sport
2017 in Argentine rugby union
2017 in Canadian rugby union
2017 in American rugby union
International rugby union competitions hosted by Uruguay